A troll is a being in Nordic folklore, including Norse mythology. In Old Norse sources, beings described as trolls dwell in isolated areas of rocks, mountains, or caves, live together in small family units, and are rarely helpful to human beings.

In later Scandinavian folklore, trolls became beings in their own right, where they live far from human habitation, are not Christianized, and are considered dangerous to human beings. Depending on the source, their appearance varies greatly; trolls may be ugly and slow-witted, or look and behave exactly like human beings, with no particularly grotesque characteristic about them.

Trolls are sometimes associated with particular landmarks in Scandinavian folklore, which at times may be explained as formed from a troll exposed to sunlight. Trolls are depicted in a variety of media in modern popular culture.

Etymology
The Old Norse nouns troll and trǫll (variously meaning "fiend, demon, werewolf, jötunn") and Middle High German troll, trolle "fiend" (according to philologist Vladimir Orel likely borrowed from Old Norse) developed from Proto-Germanic neuter noun *trullan. The origin of the Proto-Germanic word is unknown. Additionally, the Old Norse verb trylla 'to enchant, to turn into a troll' and the Middle High German verb trüllen "to flutter" both developed from the Proto-Germanic verb *trulljanan, a derivative of *trullan.

Norse mythology
In Norse mythology, troll, like thurs, is a term applied to jötnar and is mentioned throughout the Old Norse corpus. In Old Norse sources, trolls are said to dwell in isolated mountains, rocks, and caves, sometimes live together (usually as father-and-daughter or mother-and-son), and are rarely described as helpful or friendly. The Prose Edda book Skáldskaparmál describes an encounter between an unnamed troll woman and the 9th-century skald Bragi Boddason. According to the section, Bragi was driving through "a certain forest" late one evening when a troll woman aggressively asked him who he was, in the process describing herself:

Bragi responds in turn, describing himself and his abilities as a skillful skald, before the scenario ends.

There is much confusion and overlap in the use of Old Norse terms jötunn, troll, þurs, and risi, which describe various beings. Lotte Motz theorized that these were originally four distinct classes of beings: lords of nature (jötunn), mythical magicians (troll), hostile monsters (þurs), and heroic and courtly beings (risi), the last class being the youngest addition. On the other hand, Ármann Jakobson is critical of Motz's interpretation and calls this theory "unsupported by any convincing evidence". Ármann highlights that the term is used to denote various beings, such as a jötunn or mountain-dweller, a witch, an abnormally strong or large or ugly person, an evil spirit, a ghost, a blámaðr, a magical boar, a heathen demi-god, a demon, a brunnmigi, or a berserker.

Scandinavian folklore

Later in Scandinavian folklore, trolls become defined as a particular type of being. Numerous tales are recorded about trolls in which they are frequently described as being extremely old, very strong, but slow and dim-witted, and are at times described as man-eaters and as turning to stone upon contact with sunlight. However, trolls are also attested as looking much the same as human beings, without any particularly hideous appearance about them, but living far away from human habitation and generally having "some form of social organization"—unlike the rå and näck, who are attested as "solitary beings". According to John Lindow, what sets them apart is that they are not Christian, and those who encounter them do not know them. Therefore, trolls were in the end dangerous, regardless of how well they might get along with Christian society, and trolls display a habit of bergtagning ('kidnapping'; literally "mountain-taking") and overrunning a farm or estate.

Lindow states that the etymology of the word "troll" remains uncertain, though he defines trolls in later Swedish folklore as "nature beings" and as "all-purpose otherworldly being[s], equivalent, for example, to fairies in Anglo-Celtic traditions". They "therefore appear in various migratory legends where collective nature-beings are called for". Lindow notes that trolls are sometimes swapped out for cats and "little people" in the folklore record.

A Scandinavian folk belief that lightning frightens away trolls and jötnar appears in numerous Scandinavian folktales, and may be a late reflection of the god Thor's role in fighting such beings. In connection, the lack of trolls and jötnar in modern Scandinavia is sometimes explained as a result of the "accuracy and efficiency of the lightning strokes". Additionally, the absence of trolls in regions of Scandinavia is described in folklore as being a "consequence of the constant din of the church-bells". This ringing caused the trolls to leave for other lands, although not without some resistance; numerous traditions relate how trolls destroyed a church under construction or hurled boulders and stones at completed churches. Large local stones are sometimes described as the product of a troll's toss. Additionally, into the 20th century, the origins of particular Scandinavian landmarks, such as particular stones, are ascribed to trolls who may, for example, have turned to stone upon exposure to sunlight.

Lindow compares the trolls of the Swedish folk tradition to Grendel, the supernatural mead hall invader in the Old English poem Beowulf, and notes that "just as the poem Beowulf emphasizes not the harrying of Grendel but the cleansing of the hall of Beowulf, so the modern tales stress the moment when the trolls are driven off."

Smaller trolls are attested as living in burial mounds and in mountains in Scandinavian folk tradition. In Denmark, these creatures are recorded as troldfolk ("troll-folk"), bjergtrolde ("mountain-trolls"), or bjergfolk ("mountain-folk") and in Norway also as troldfolk ("troll-folk") and tusser. Trolls may be described as small, human-like beings or as tall as men depending on the region of origin of the story.

In Norwegian tradition, similar tales may be told about the larger trolls and the Huldrefolk ("hidden-folk"), yet a distinction is made between the two. The use of the word trow in Orkney and Shetland, to mean beings which are very like the Huldrefolk in Norway, may suggest a common origin for the terms. The word troll may have been used by pagan Norse settlers in Orkney and Shetland as a collective term for supernatural beings who should be respected and avoided rather than worshipped. Troll could later have become specialized as a description of the larger, more menacing Jötunn-kind whereas Huldrefolk may have developed as the term for smaller trolls.

John Arnott MacCulloch posited a connection between the Old Norse vættir and trolls, suggesting that both concepts may derive from spirits of the dead.

Troll, a Norwegian research station in Antarctica, is so named because of the rugged mountains which stand around that place like trolls. It includes a ground station which tracks satellites in polar orbit.

In popular culture
Trolls have appeared in many works of modern fiction, most often, in the fantasy genre, with classic examples being the portrayal of trolls in works such as in Tolkien's Middle-earth or the Dungeons & Dragons roleplaying game. 

Beginning in the 1950s, Troll dolls were a popular toy based on the folklore creature. Trolls based on the dolls appeared in the Hollywood animated movie Trolls (2016) and its subsequent sequel Trolls World Tour in 2022. 

Troll is the name, and main antagonist, of a 2022 Norwegian movie released by Netflix on December 1, 2022.

See also
 Þorgerðr Hölgabrúðr, a Norse goddess whose surname sometimes contains the element -troll
 
 Moomintroll, a fictional protagonist of The Moomins
 Hugo, a Danish video game and media franchise

Notes

References

 Ármann Jakobsson (2006). "The Good, the Bad and the Ugly: Bárðar saga and Its Giants" in The Fantastic in Old Norse/Icelandic Literature, pp. 54–62. Available online at dur.ac.uk (archived version from March 4, 2007)
 Ármann Jakobsson (2008). "The Trollish Acts of Þorgrímr the Witch: The Meanings of Troll and Ergi in Medieval Iceland" in Saga-Book 32 (2008), 39–68. 
 Kvideland, Reimund. Sehmsdorf, Henning K. (editors) (2010). Scandinavian Folk Belief and Legend. University of Minnesota Press. 
 Lindow, John (1978). Swedish Folktales and Legends. University of California Press. 
 Lindow, John (2007). "Narrative Worlds, Human Environments, and Poets: The Case of Bragi" as published in Andrén, Anders. Jennbert, Kristina. Raudvere, Catharina. Old Norse Religion in Long-Term Perspectives. Nordic Academic Press.  (google book)
 MacCulloch, John Arnott (1930). Eddic Mythology, The Mythology of All Races In Thirteen volumes, Vol. II. Cooper Square Publishers. 
 Narváez, Peter (1997). The Good People: New Fairylore Essays (The pages referenced are from a paper by Alan Bruford entitled "Trolls, Hillfolk, Finns, and Picts: The Identity of the Good Neighbors in Orkney and Shetland"). University Press of Kentucky. 
 Orchard, Andy (1997). Dictionary of Norse Myth and Legend. Cassell. 
 Orel, Vladimir (2003). A Handbook of Germanic Etymology. Brill. 
 Simek, Rudolf (2007) translated by Angela Hall. Dictionary of Northern Mythology. D.S. Brewer 
 Thorpe, Benjamin (1851). Northern Mythology, Compromising the Principal Traditions and Superstitions of Scandinavia, North Germany, and the Netherlands: Compiled from Original and Other Sources. In three Volumes. Scandinavian Popular Traditions and Superstitions, Volume 2. Lumley.

External links

Trolls
Scandinavian folklore
Norwegian folklore
Swedish folklore
Germanic mythology
Supernatural legends
Scandinavian legendary creatures
Creatures in Norse mythology
Mythic humanoids
Jötnar
Fairy tale stock characters